Jovana Kiprijanovska (born 30 December 2001) is a Macedonian female handballer for Sambre-Avesnois Handball and the North Macedonian national team.

She represented the North Macedonia at the 2022 European Women's Handball Championship.

References

External links

2001 births
Living people
People from Kumanovo
Expatriate handball players